Arch Capital Group Ltd. (Arch Capital or ACGL) is an American Bermuda-based public limited liability company which writes insurance, reinsurance and mortgage insurance on a worldwide basis, with a focus on specialty lines, the segment of the insurance industry where the more difficult and unusual risks are written. It has operations in Bermuda, the United States, Canada, Europe, Australia and, in the case of mortgage insurance, Hong Kong.

History 
Risk Capital Holdings, Inc. was formed in Delaware in March 1995 and commenced operations in September 1995, after an initial public offering.

In May 2000, Risk Capital Holdings sold substantially all of the reinsurance operations of Risk Capital Reinsurance Co., its wholly owned subsidiary, to Folksamerica Reinsurance Co., and at the same time announced it was changing its name to Arch Capital Group Ltd.

Arch Mortgage Guaranty began operations in 2015 and, in August 2016, it bought United Guaranty, AIG‘s mortgage insurance unit, for US$3.4 billion, making ACGL the world’s largest mortgage insurer.

Notable employees

Meredith Whitney (born 1969), businesswoman

References

External links

Financial services companies established in 1995
Insurance companies of Bermuda